Elaine Svenonius is an American librarian and library scholar, known for her research on bibliographic control, particularly cataloging, classification, and indexing.  She is best known for bringing a philosophical knowledge organization approach to cataloging theory.

Svenonius received an MA in Philosophy from the University of Pennsylvania in 1957, an MA in Library Science in 1965 from the University of Chicago, and a PhD in Library Science in 1971, as well from the University of Chicago.

In The Intellectual Foundation of Information Organization, Svenonius attempts to "synthesize the literature of
information organization in a language and at a level of generality to make it understandable to persons outside the field of library and information science" and to "synthesize subject and descriptive cataloging within a common conceptual framework."  The book is frequently assigned to Master of Library and Information Science students, among whom it is nicknamed "the red devil".

Svenonius was the recipient of the ALCTS Margaret Mann Citation
and the Ranganathan Award for Classification Research.

References

American librarians
American women librarians
Living people
Year of birth missing (living people)
University of Pennsylvania alumni
University of Chicago Graduate Library School alumni
21st-century American women